Acephalgic migraine (also called migraine aura without headache, amigrainous migraine, isolated visual migraine, and optical migraine) is a neurological syndrome. It is a relatively uncommon variant of migraine in which the patient may experience some migraine symptoms such as  aura, nausea, photophobia, and hemiparesis, but does not experience headache. It is generally classified as an event fulfilling the conditions of migraine with aura with no (or minimal) headache. It is sometimes distinguished from visual-only migraine aura without headache, also called ocular migraine.

Symptoms and misdiagnosis
Acephalgic migraines can occur in individuals of any age. Some individuals, more commonly male, only experience acephalgic migraine, but frequently patients also experience migraine with headache. Generally, the condition is more than twice as likely to occur in females than males. Pediatric acephalgic migraines are listed along with other childhood periodic syndromes by W.A. Al-Twaijri and M.I. Shevell as "migraine equivalents" (although not listed as such in the International Classification of Headache Disorders), which can be good predictors of the future development of typical migraines. Individuals who experience acephalgic migraines in childhood are highly likely to develop typical migraines as they grow older. Among women, incidents of acephalgic migraine increase during perimenopause.

Scintillating scotoma is the most common symptom which usually happens concurrently with Expanding Fortification Spectra. Also frequently reported is monocular blindness. Acephalgic migraines typically do not persist more than a few hours and may last for as little as 15 seconds. On rare occasions, they may continue for up to two days.

Acephalgic migraines may resemble transient ischemic attacks or, when longer in duration, stroke. The concurrence of other symptoms such as photophobia and nausea can help in determining the proper diagnosis. Occasionally, patients with acephalgic migraine are misdiagnosed as having epilepsy with visual seizures, but the reverse misdiagnosis is more common.

Treatment
The prevention and treatment of acephalgic migraine is broadly the same as for classical migraine, but the symptoms are usually less severe than those of classic migraine, so treatment is less likely to be required.

See also
 ICHD classification and diagnosis of migraine

References

Headaches